The Barton House in Florissant, Missouri is a "Missouri French" style house from 1923.  It was listed on the National Register of Historic Places in 1979.

It is one of 16 houses in the City of St. Ferdinand which were described as "Missouri French" and listed together on the National Register in 1979, as part of a larger study of historic resources in the area.

References

Houses on the National Register of Historic Places in Missouri
Houses completed in 1923
Houses in St. Louis County, Missouri
National Register of Historic Places in St. Louis County, Missouri